Sonia Silvestre (16 August 1952 – 19 April 2014) was a Dominican singer from San Pedro de Macorís. 

She was married to the broadcaster, producer and host Yaqui Núñez del Risco. After they divorced, Silvestre moved to Mexico, where she remained about three years. She had a long-term relationship with the Venezuelan photographer José Betancourt, the father of her son André and her daughter Eloísa; they married in 2009. In 2010, she performed a tribute to Luis Días.

She suffered a massive stroke and two heart attacks on 17 April 2014 in Santo Domingo. She was 61 years old.

Discography
1974: Esta Es Sonia Silvestre
1975: La Nueva Canción
1976: Nueva Canción
1978: Sonia Canta Poetas de la Patria
Folkhoy
Corazón de Vellonera
Una Verdadera Intérprete
Mi Corazón Te Seguirá
Edición Especial de Grandes Éxitos de los Años 70
1990: Yo Quiero Andar
1994: Amor y Desamor
2007: Verde y Negro

References

1952 births
2014 deaths
People from San Pedro de Macorís
20th-century Dominican Republic women singers
21st-century Dominican Republic women singers
Women in Latin music